This is list of airports in Slovakia, grouped by type and sorted by location.



Airports 

Airport names shown in bold indicate the airport has scheduled service on commercial airlines.

See also 
 Transport in Slovakia
 Slovak Air Force
 List of airports by ICAO code: L#LZ – Slovakia
 Wikipedia:WikiProject Aviation/Airline destination lists: Europe#Slovakia

References 
 
  - includes IATA codes
World Aero Data - ICAO codes and coordinates
Great Circle Mapper - IATA/ICAO codes and coordinates
Transport Authority of Slovakia: list of aerodromes and heliports
|Aerodrome JASNA Letisko| - Aerodrome JASNA ICAO

 
Slovakia
Airports
Airports
Slovakia